Isla de Pascua Department, also named Easter Island Department, was one of the departments of the historical province of Valparaíso before the "regionalization" of 1974. It was named after Easter Island and comprised such territory and the Sala y Gómez island.

History 
The department was created by Law No. 16.441 by president Eduardo Frei Montalva. It became effective on 1 March 1966, when it was published in the Diario Oficial de la República de Chile.  Hanga Roa was declared as the capital of the department, and would comprise the territories of Easter Island and Isla Sala y Gómez. Its only commune-subdelegation was Isla de Pascua, subdivided into three districts.

The law also indicated that the department would belong, in Chamber of Deputies elections, to the Valparaíso and Quillota departmental circunscription.  As the commune was created, a municipality was named by the president, with seven members (regidores). Their term expired in May 1967. A local court was created.

Administration 
The local administration was located in Hanga Roa, where the departmental government was located.

Governors

References 

History of Easter Island
Former departments of Chile